The term Orthodox Christianity in Turkey may refer to:

 Eastern Orthodox Christianity in Turkey, representing communities and institutions of Eastern Orthodox Church, in Turkey
 Oriental Orthodox Christianity in Turkey, representing communities and institutions of Oriental Orthodox Church, in Turkey

See also
 Orthodox Christianity (disambiguation)
 Turkey (disambiguation)